Pro-jekt are an English rock band who have sometimes described themselves as gothic metal, although it has been noted that they have a darkwave sound. They formed in January 2000, in Derbyshire, England. They engineered and financed their own demo album, and, in August 2001, signed to Nightbreed Recordings Ltd. Pro-jekt released their debut album on Nightbreed Recordings in April 2002. On the live circuit, the band played over 90 performances, including touring with Mortiis and Carl McCoy's side project, The Last Rites. In 2003, Pro-jekt completed a full UK tour and held live dates in Italy, Belgium and France.

After completing the 20 date "Evilution Tour" at Fibbers in York at the end of 2003, the band regrouped back in Derbyshire to start recording their next studio album. However, Shaun Travis was taken ill, and, in February 2004, it was mutually decided that Travis should leave the band.

In July of that year, Pro-jekt signed a new singer, Mick Witham, to lead the band. He quickly got involved in rehearsals and Pro-jekt then featured in the UK Grudge tour, supporting Mortiis. They have toured as part of 'The Unholy Trinity', appeared at the Carnival of Souls, along with an appearance in front of a sell-out crowd at the Lumous Festival in Finland. A song by Pro-jekt also featured on Project Gotham Racing 3.

The band was originally going to be called 'Projekt', but were threatened with legal action from Projekt Records, and so, instead, placed the dash in their name.

Members

Current members
Mick Witham - Vocals
Phil May - Guitars
Alistair Middleton - Synths, Programming

Ex-members
Shaun Travis - Vocals
Kevin Rice - Bass

Discography

Albums
Suicide Disco (2001)
Encryption (2002)
Defiance (2006) 
Reign Of Scars (2009)
Detonation EP (2010) (three tracks)

Other releases
Pro-jekt have also released a DVD called Evilution. It features two music videos and a recorded live show. Also, they have released an EP called Mean Times and appeared on five compilation albums, being Sick Twisted Individual Volume 1, The Gothic Sounds of Nightbreed 4, Kill Your Management Volume 5, Dark Salvation Volume 1 and Sick Twisted Individual Volume 2.

References

English rock music groups